Santo D'Angelo, also known as Sonny D'Angelo (born 5 October 1995) is an Italian footballer who plays as a midfielder for  club Avellino.

Club career
He spent the first two seasons of his senior career in the fifth and fourth tier (Eccellenza and Serie D) before joining Serie C club Matera.

He made his professional Serie C debut for Matera on 26 September 2015 in a game against Casertana.

He stayed in Serie C for 5 seasons.

On 8 July 2019 he signed with Serie B club Livorno.

He made his Serie B debut for Livorno on 29 September 2019 in a game against Salernitana. He substituted Andrea Luci in the 67th minute.

On 10 January 2020, he joined Serie C club Potenza on loan with an option to buy.

On 25 September 2020, he signed a two-year contract with Avellino.

On 26 January 2022, he moved to Reggiana. 

On 3 January 2023, D'Angelo returned to Avellino on a 2.5-year deal.

References

External links
 

1995 births
Living people
Footballers from Palermo
Italian footballers
Association football midfielders
Serie B players
Serie C players
Serie D players
Matera Calcio players
S.S. Racing Club Fondi players
A.S.D. Sicula Leonzio players
U.S. Livorno 1915 players
Potenza Calcio players
U.S. Avellino 1912 players
A.C. Reggiana 1919 players